Yaniv Iczkovits ( born May 2, 1975) is an Israeli writer known for his novels, essays and philosophical work. His 2015 fantasy-historical adventure novel The Slaughterman's Daughter, with an unlikely assortment of Jewish characters on a quest in late 19th century Czarist Russia, has been translated into several European languages and gained critical acclaim.

Early life and education
Iczkovits was born in Beersheba and grew up in Rishon Lezion. His grandparents immigrated to Mandatory Palestine after the Holocaust, from Hungary, Czechoslovakia, and Romania. One grandfather was a survivor of the Auschwitz concentration camp.

In 1993 he enlisted in the IDF, volunteered for the Maglan elite commando unit and served as an officer. As a team commander he took part in the fighting in southern Lebanon. Upon his discharge from the IDF with the rank of lieutenant, he traveled to the Far East.
He enrolled in the Adi Lautman Interdisciplinary Program for Outstanding Students at Tel Aviv University for his undergraduate studies, and during his master's degree he spent a year as a Chevening fellow at Oxford University. His doctoral dissertation dealt with Ludwig Wittgenstein's thought and analyzed the interplay between ethics and language.

Academic career
He taught for eight years at the University of Tel Aviv's Philosophy Department. After receiving his Ph.D., he went on to pursue postdoctoral research at Columbia University in New York City, where he adapted his doctoral dissertation into the book Wittgenstein's Ethical Thought.

For the academic year 2021/2022, Iczkovits was appointed to serve as artist in residence at the Israel Institute for Advanced Studies at the Hebrew University of Jerusalem, a position previously held by poet Agi Mishol and playwright Joshua Sobol.

Views and positions
In 2002, after a stint of reservist service in Gaza during the Second Intifada, Iczkovits, together with social activist David Zonsheine, initiated the "Combatants' Letter," in which they declared their refusal to serve in the territories of Judea, Samaria and the Gaza Strip. An initial 51 soldiers and officers signed the letter, which was published as an advertisement in the mass-circulation daily newspaper Haaretz. This launched the movement known as Ometz LeSarev (Hebrew: "Courage to refuse"). Some six hundred Israeli soldiers affirmed their refusal to serve in the occupied territories. Iczkovits spent a month in military prison for refusing to go on additional reserve service in the territories.

Personal life
Iczkovits lives with his wife and three daughters in Tel Aviv.

Awards and nominations

Awards
 2007 Inaugural Haaretz Books Prize for his first book, Pulse
 2010 Prime Minister's Prize for Hebrew Literary Works (Levi Eshkol Prize), for Adam and Sophie
 2015 Funding from the Ministry of Culture and Sport's  People of the Book award for translation of Hebrew literature into foreign languages, for The Slaughterman's Daughter" 
 2016 The Ramat Gan Prize for Literature awarded for "literary excellence in the original novel category" for The Slaughterman's Daughter
 2016 Inaugural award of the Agnon Prize for the Literary Arts, for The Slaughterman's Daughter
 2021 The Jewish Quarterly-Wingate Prize for The Slaughterman's Daughter

Shortlisted
 2017 The Slaughterman's Daughter: shortlisted for the Sapir Prize
2021 No One Leaves Palo Alto: shortlisted for the Sapir Prize

Reviewers' notable mention for The Slaughterman's Daughter
 2020  The Economist - among the eight "Books of the Year" list  
2020  The Times - among the ten "Books of the Year" 
 2021 Kirkus Reviews - "One of the 10 fiction books to look forward to in 2021" 
 2021 Publishers Weekly - "Best Books"

The Slaughterman's Daughter reviewed by the major press
 2021 The Wall Street Journal - "Fiction: ‘In Memory of Memory’ Review" 
 2021 The New York Times - "Chasing Down a Deadbeat Dad, With a Knife Strapped to Her Leg"

Publications

Nonfiction
Wittgenstein's Ethical Thought (Based on his doctoral dissertation), London, Palgrave Macmillan,; 2012  .
Convicts and Heroes: Wittgensteinian Afterthoughts on Uri Barabash's 'In Clean Conscience' and 'Double Alpha'. Article published by The Free Library, 2017

Fiction

 Dofeq (Pulse), Hakibbutz Hameuchad Publishing, 2007, Danacode 310004255
 in Italian: Batticuore, 2010, ; translated by Antonio Di Gesù 
 Adam and Sophie, Hakibbutz Hameuchad - Siman Kriya, 2009, Danacode 310004656
 Dinei Yerusha (Laws of Inheritance, novella), Achuzat Bayit Publishing, 2010, 
 Tikkun Ahar Hatzot (An After Midnight Prayer), Keter Publishing, 2015,  
 in Italian: Tikkun o la vendetta di Mende Speismann per mano della sorella Fanny, 2018, ; translated by Ofra Bannet and Raffaella Scardi
 in Dutch: De Slachtersdochter, 2019, De Geus, ; translated by Hilde Pach
 in English (U.K. edition): The Slaughterman's Daughter: The Avenging of Mende Speissman by the Hand of her Sister Fanny, 2020, MacLehose Press, ; translated by Orr Scharf
 in English (U.S. edition): The Slaughterman's Daughter: A novel, Feb. 23, 2021, Schocken Books, ; translated by Orr Scharf
 in Polish: Córka rzeźnika, October 2021, ; translated by Anna Halbersztat
 Af Echad Lo Ozev et Palo Alto (Nobody Leaves Palo Alto), Keter Publishing, 2020, Danacode 10-279193

References

External links
  Author's page at the Institute for the Translation of Hebrew Literature website
  Author's page at Goodreads.com
 

1975 births
Jewish writers
Israeli Jews
Living people
Academic staff of Tel Aviv University
International Writing Program alumni
Adi Lautman Interdisciplinary Program for Outstanding Students alumni
Alumni of the University of Oxford
Israeli writers
21st-century Israeli writers
Recipients of Prime Minister's Prize for Hebrew Literary Works